This is a glossary of terms used in fencing.

A

B

C

D

E

F

G

H

I

J

L

M

N

O

P

Q

R

S

T

V

W

Y

Historical and foreign fencing terminology
Note that the vocabulary here is primarily a glossary of modern fencing terms.  Over time, the terminology has evolved, and different terminology may be found in Medieval and Renaissance sources.  In many cases, English, French, Italian, and even German terminology may be used (often interchangeably) for the same thing. It should also be noted that American and British English differ in several points of fencing terminology, though some effort has been made in this article to indicate both conventions.

German

Italian

See also 
 Outline of fencing

References 

Glossaries of sports
Fencing
Wikipedia glossaries using description lists